Leimapokpam Nandakumar Singh (born 1 March 1960) is an Indian football manager. He is currently the head coach of I-League club TRAU.

Coaching career
He started his professional career with Royal Wahingdoh as an assistant in 2014 he achieve promotion to i league with club as a manager. In 2017, he appointed as the head coach of second division club TRAU and in 2019, he achieved promotion with the club. He later became appointed as the technical director of the club and after the dismissal of the head coach he return to the head coach position. In 2022, his club TRAU faced NEROCA in "Imphal Derby" in Group-C opener during the 131st edition of Durand Cup, where they tasted a 3–1 defeat.

Honours

Manager

Royal Wahingdoh
I-League 2nd Division: 2014

TRAU
I-League 2nd Division: 2018–19

References

External links

Living people
I-League managers
1960 births
People from Manipur
Indian football managers
Indian sports coaches
TRAU FC managers